The 1900 Primera División was the 1st season of top-flight football in Uruguay. It was the first official championship held by the Uruguayan Football Association (AUF).

Overview
The tournament consisted of a round-robin championship. It took only four teams, all founding members of the Uruguayan Football Association, among which would be victorious Central Uruguay Railway Cricket Club.

Clubs

League standings

References
 Uruguay – List of final tables (RSSSF)
 IFFHS – Campeonato Uruguayo 1900

Uruguayan Primera División seasons
Uru
1900 in Uruguayan football